is a Japanese manga series by Yukiko Natsume. It has been serialized in Kodansha's josei manga magazine Be Love since 2016 and has been collected in three tankōbon volumes. An anime television series adaptation by Gathering premiered from October 5, 2018, to March 22, 2019.

Characters

Media

Manga

References

External links

Anime series based on manga
Animated television series about penguins
Gathering
Iyashikei anime and manga
Josei manga
Kodansha manga